This is a list of political parties in Switzerland.

Switzerland has a multi-party system. This arithmetic formula divides the seven cabinet seats among representatives of the four largest parties.

Political parties in Switzerland

Federal and cantonal parliaments 

The following parties are represented either in the Swiss Federal Assembly as of 2022 or in cantonal parliaments and executive councils as of 2021. For their names in the 4 national languages of Switzerland, see #Names in the national languages below.

For more detailed information on the political positions of some of the parties listed below, see here: For Swiss political party strength on the municipal level, see here:

Minor parties 
The following groups or parties are not represented at either the cantonal or national level (but may hold positions in municipal parliaments).

Historical parties

Names in the national languages

Sources: The Swiss Federal Chancellery

Relative importance

At the federal level

Overall

See also
 Politics of Switzerland
 List of political parties by country

Notes

References

Bibliography
 Pierre Cormon, Swiss Politics for Complete Beginners, Editions Slatkine, 2014.

External links 
 Federal Chancellery

Switzerland
 
Politics of Switzerland
Political parties
Switzerland
Political parties